Walter Hempel (12 August 1887 – 10 January 1940) was a German amateur football player who competed in the 1912 Summer Olympics.

International career 
He played right back in the first international match played by Germany in 1908. Born in Leipzig, Hempel was a member of the German Olympic squad in 1912 and played one match in the consolation tournament of the Summer Games in Stockholm. Overall he won eleven caps for Germany.

References

External links
 
 
 
 
Profile at Sports-reference.com

1887 births
1940 deaths
German footballers
Germany international footballers
Olympic footballers of Germany
Footballers at the 1912 Summer Olympics
Footballers from Leipzig
Association football defenders